Florentin Rădulescu (born 29 July 1976) is a Romanian former professional footballer who played as a goalkeeper for teams such as Flacăra Moreni, Petrolul Ploiești, Rapid București, Argeș Pitești or CS Otopeni, among others. After retirement, Rădulescu was the goalkeeping coach of teams such as Academica Clinceni, Sepsi Sfântu Gheorghe or Dinamo București.

Honours
Rocar București
Cupa României runner-up: 2000–01

Rapid București
 Cupa României: 2001–02

References

External links
 
 

1976 births
Living people
People from Pucioasa
Romanian footballers
Association football goalkeepers
Liga I players
Liga II players
Liga III players
CSM Flacăra Moreni players
FC Petrolul Ploiești players
AFC Rocar București players
FC Rapid București players
FC Astra Giurgiu players
FC Argeș Pitești players
FC Vaslui players
CS Otopeni players